The Irish grid reference system is a system of geographic grid references used for paper mapping in Ireland (both Northern Ireland and the Republic of Ireland). The Irish grid partially overlaps the British grid, and uses a similar co-ordinate system but with a meridian more suited to its westerly location.

Usage
In general, neither Ireland nor Great Britain uses latitude or longitude in describing internal geographic locations. Instead grid reference systems are used for mapping.

The national grid referencing system was devised by the Ordnance Survey, and is heavily used in their survey data, and in maps (whether published by the Ordnance Survey of Ireland, the Ordnance Survey of Northern Ireland or commercial map producers) based on those surveys.  Additionally grid references are commonly quoted in other publications and data sources, such as guide books or government planning documents.

2001 recasting: the ITM grid

In 2001, the Ordnance Survey of Ireland and the Ordnance Survey of Northern Ireland jointly implemented a new coordinate system for Ireland called Irish Transverse Mercator, or ITM, a location-specific optimisation  of UTM, which runs in parallel with the existing Irish grid system. The ITM system was specified so as to provide precise alignment with modern high-precision global positioning receivers.

Grid letters

The squares are numbered A to Z with I being omitted. Seven of the squares do not actually cover any land in Ireland: A, E, K, P, U, Y and Z.

Eastings and northings
Within each square, eastings and northings from the origin (south west corner) of the square are given numerically. A location can be indicated to varying resolutions numerically, usually from two digits in each coordinate (for a  square) through to five (for a ) square; the most common usage is the six figure grid reference, employing three digits in each coordinate to determine a  square.

Coordinates may also be given relative to the origin of the entire  grid (in the format easting, northing). For example, the location of the Spire of Dublin on O'Connell Street may be given as 315904, 234671 as well as O1590434671. Coordinates in this format must never be truncated, because, for example, 31590, 23467 is also a valid location.

Summary parameters of the Irish Grid coordinate system 

Spheroid: Airy Modified,
Datum: 1965,
Map projection: Transverse Mercator
Latitude of Origin: 53°30'00 N
Longitude of Origin: 8°00'00 W
Scale Factor: 1.000 035
False Easting: 200000 m
False Northing: 250000 m

Notes

References

External links
 The Irish Grid - A Description of the Co-ordinate Reference System used in Ireland PDF (358kB) on the Irish Grid from OSi.
 PDF (221KB) detailing GPS to Irish Grid conversions
 A detailed (42-page) PDF file including history and map of the Irish grid and its links to Britain
 A two-page article for the American Society for Photogrammetry and Remote Sensing summarising the above.
 History and overview of the system, from OSI
 OSI online coordinate converter tool
 Clickable webmap that shows Irish grid references
 LatLong <> OSi Grid Ref converts & presents in many formats, generates specific links to that location for several useful map web pages - 1840 - present. LatLong WSG84 <> GB, Ireland (inc NI) and Chanel Islands (30U) GR formats recognised. Distance measure for dog-leg routes & area calculations.

Geography of Ireland
Maps from Ordnance Survey
Geographic coordinate systems
Land surveying systems
Geodesy